Najas tenuissima is a species of flowering plant belonging to the family Hydrocharitaceae.

Its native range is Finland to European Russia, Russian Far East to Japan.

Synonym:
 Caulinia tenuissima (A.Braun ex Magnus) Tzvelev

References

tenuissima